Cortina Systems, Inc. is a supplier of integrated circuits (ICs) for broadband communications founded in 2001. It is based in California.

Cortina System was bought by Inphi Corporation in 2014.

History 
Cortina Systems was founded by Amir Nayyerhabibi (who served as president and CEO) in 2001 in the Menlo Park, California library, located in Silicon Valley.
It has development centers in USA, Canada, China, Taiwan, Israel.

Cortina’s product line spans computer and telecommunication networking: the company has products for core, enterprise, metropolitan high-speed networks, as well as products for the digital home networks. Products include:  

 Ethernet: 1-, 2-, and 4-port 10Gbit/s Ethernet MACs; 4-, 10-, 12-, and 24-port 1Gbit/s Ethernet MACs
 Transport: 2.5Gbit/s, 10Gbit/s and 40Gbit/s FEC/OTN Framers; 100Gbit/s FEC/OTN/Ethernet Framer; 2.5G and 10Gbit/s VCAT framer
 Framer: SONET/SDH POS, ATM, and GFP framer for OC-3 to OC-192 with integrated SerDes; RPR framer, RPR bridge
 Access: 4-port EPON OLT, EPON ONU 
 PHY: 10Mbit/s transceiver; 1-, 2-, 4-, and 8-port Fast Ethernet transceivers: 6- and 8-port Fast Ethernet repeaters
 T1/E1: 1-, 4-, and 8-port T1/E1/J1 transceivers and repeaters; OC3 transceiver
 Digital Home Processor: Multi-core, Storage, Security

In 2006 it announced the Interlaken protocol with Cisco Systems.

Manufacturing 

Cortina is a fabless semiconductor company. It outsources all semiconductor manufacturing to merchant foundries. The company is based in Sunnyvale, California. It also has other research and development sites in Hsinchu (Taiwan), Ottawa (Canada), Raleigh (USA) and Shanghai (China).

Acquisitions 
Cortina has acquired several companies. In October 2014 Cortina was acquired by Inphi Corporation, with the exception of Cortina’s Access and Digital Home business.

References

External links
 Cortina web site
 2008 Silicon Valley Deloitte Technology Fast 50 Awards

Semiconductor companies of the United States
Networking companies of the United States
Electronics companies established in 2001
American companies established in 2001
Fabless semiconductor companies
Companies based in Sunnyvale, California
2014 mergers and acquisitions